The Hayman Nunataks are a small group of isolated nunataks at the eastern end of the Grosvenor Mountains in Antarctica,  north of Larkman Nunatak. They were named by the Advisory Committee on Antarctic Names for Noel R. Hayman, a United States Antarctic Research Program aurora scientist at Hallett Station in 1962.

References

Nunataks of the Ross Dependency
Dufek Coast